Rani Chitralekha Bhonsle (26 February 1941 – 16 August 2015) was a political and social worker and a Member of Parliament elected from the Ramtek constituency in the Indian state of Maharashtra being an Indian National Congress candidate.

Early life
Bhonsle was born on 26 February 1941 in Baroda in the Indian state of Gujarat. She married Tejsingrao Bhonsle on 25 December 1959 and has two sons, Laxmansingh and Mansingh as well as three daughters, Lalitaraje, Menkaraje and Ketkiraje.

Education & interests
Rani completed her Bachelor of Arts from Sahajirao Gaikwad College, M.S. University, Baroda (Gujarat). Her interests include painting and reading. She is also a Chairperson of the District Volleyball Association, Nagpur.

Career
Rani was elected to the 12th Lok Sabha in 1998. During 1998–99, she was a Member on the Consultative Committee, Ministry of Coal.

References

1941 births
2015 deaths
Women in Maharashtra politics
India MPs 1998–1999
People from Nagpur district
Articles created or expanded during Women's History Month (India) - 2014
Marathi politicians
Lok Sabha members from Maharashtra
20th-century Indian women politicians
20th-century Indian politicians
Indian National Congress politicians from Maharashtra